Protitame subalbaria is a species of geometrid moth in the family Geometridae.

The MONA or Hodges number for Protitame subalbaria is 6266.

References

Further reading

External links

 

Ennominae
Articles created by Qbugbot
Moths described in 1873